Two companies have been known by the name National Bus Company:
National Bus Company (Australia) – Australian bus company that operated between 1993 and 2013.
National Bus Company (UK) – British bus company that operated between 1969 and 1988.